Torsten Nyström (11 July 1878 – 13 September 1953) was a Swedish sports shooter. He competed in two events at the 1912 Summer Olympics.

References

External links
 

1878 births
1953 deaths
Swedish male sport shooters
Olympic shooters of Sweden
Shooters at the 1912 Summer Olympics
Sportspeople from Gothenburg